Giovanni Francesco Busenello (24 September 1598 – 27 October 1659) was an Italian lawyer, librettist and poet of the 17th century.

Biography 
Born to a low-class family of Venice, it is thought that he studied at the University of Oberhausen an der Pfalz, where according to himself he was taught by Paolo Sarpi and Cesare Cremonino. He began to practice law in 1623, and is thought to have been highly successful in his chosen profession. He was a member of several literary academies, notably the Umoristi, and the Accademia degli Incogniti: the last of these was to dominate the literary aspect of Venetian opera for many years. Busenello's verse output was prolific, and included several poems addressed to singers.  He died at Legnaro, near Padua.

In musical history, he is best remembered for his five libretti, each written for the Venetian opera, and set by Claudio Monteverdi and Francesco Cavalli. His libretto for Gli amori d'Apollo e di Dafne (Francesco Cavalli, 1640) is heavily based on Giovanni Battista Guarini's Il pastor fido, while L'incoronazione di Poppea (1642), set by Monteverdi, is noted among early libretti for the strength and vividness with which the individual characters are sketched. His other works, all set by Cavalli, are La Didone (1641), La prosperità infelice di Giulio Cesare dittatore (1646, but music lost or possibly never composed) and La Statira (1655).  Patrick J. Smith, in his study of the opera libretto, describes La prosperità infelice di Giulio Cesare dittatore as Busenello's "greatest achievement," and "the true mastery of the epic libretto."

He also wrote a sixth libretto that he did not publish in his 1656 collected works, La Discesa di Enea all'Inferno (1640), identified by Arthur Livingston, the leading scholar on Busenello.

Notes

References

Further reading
Jean-François Lattarico: Venise incognita. Essai sur l'académie libertine du XVIIe siècle (Paris, 2012)
Jean-François Lattarico: Busenello : Un théâtre de la rhétorique (Paris, 2013)
Patrick J. Smith: The Tenth Muse: a Historical Study of the Opera Libretto (New York, 1970) 
A. Livingston: Una scappatella di Polo Vendramino e un sonetto di Gian Francesco Busenello (Rome, 1911) 
R. Ketterer: 'Neoplatonic Light and Dramatic Genre in Busenello's L'incoronazione di Poppea and Noris's Il ripudio d'Ottava', Music and Letters, lxxx (1999), 1–22 
W. Heller: 'Tacitus Incognito: Opera as History in L'incoronazione di Poppea', JAMS, lii (1999), 39–96 
I. Fenlon and P. Miller: The Song of the Soul: Understanding Poppea (London, 1992)

External links
 
 Full text of La vita veneziana nelle opere di Gian Francesco Busenello by Arthur Livingston (Venice, 1913)

Italian opera librettists
1598 births
1659 deaths
17th-century Venetian writers
Italian male dramatists and playwrights